Johnson Island is a river island in the U.S. state of Georgia.

Johnson Island was named after Benjamin Johnson, an original owner of the site.

References

Landforms of Harris County, Georgia
Islands of Georgia (U.S. state)